Xu Guangchun (November 1944 – 21 October 2022) was a Chinese politician who served as the Communist Party Secretary of Henan province between 2004 and 2009.

Biography
Xu Guangchun was born in Shaoxing, Zhejiang, China, in November 1944. Before he graduated from high school he went to work for the Hangzhou Daily newspaper as a reporter. He graduated from the Journalism Department of Renmin University of China in 1969 and joined the Communist Party of China in 1973. During this time he continued to work for local military publications, beginning in 1972 with the Anhui Production and Construction Corps, where he served as a reporter for Corps Soldiers Newspaper. In 1975 he began a seven-year stint with Xinhua News Agency's Anhui bureau.  Seven years later he joined the Chinese Photographers Association and later chaired the Anhui Photojournalist Society.  He was named to head Xinhua's Shanghai bureau in 1985, and the Beijing bureau in 1988.

In 1984 he held his first public office. Xu became the Secretary of the CPC Henan Committee in 2004, and inherited a Henan bureaucracy that underwent restructuring under Li Keqiang. During his term, he largely continued on Li's general policy direction. Xu was a member of the 16th and 17th CPC Central Committees.

He has been chosen to host high-level foreign delegations, including an August, 2009 visit to Zhengzhou by seven lieutenant governors from Arkansas, Idaho, Montana, Minnesota, Mississippi, North Dakota and Puerto Rico.

Xu was very active in journalist circles in China and has published a variety of books, including the Practical Manual for Amateur Photography, which was awarded the national Golden Key Award. He was married to Han Wufeng.

Xu left office as party chief of Henan in 2009, after having reached the typical retirement age for provincial-level officials of 65. He went on to sit on the National People's Congress Financial and Economic Affairs Committee until 2013.

References

External links
Biography of Xu Guangchun, Xinhua News Agency. 

1944 births
2022 deaths
Members of the 16th Central Committee of the Chinese Communist Party
Members of the 17th Central Committee of the Chinese Communist Party
Delegates to the 10th National People's Congress
Delegates to the 11th National People's Congress
People's Republic of China politicians from Zhejiang
Hangzhou High School alumni
Renmin University of China alumni
Chinese Communist Party politicians from Zhejiang
Writers from Shaoxing
CCP committee secretaries of Henan
People's Republic of China writers
People's Republic of China journalists
Politicians from Shaoxing
Guangming Daily people